FC Dinamo Kutaisi is a Georgian football club, which plays in Kutaisi, Georgia's second city. They play their home games at Givi Kiladze Stadium. During Georgian SSR Championships it was very famous and has many titles of that time. It is one of oldest clubs in Kutaisi. FC Dinamo Kutaisi is now playing in Meore Liga, which is third level of Georgian League.

Honours
Georgian SSR Championship:
 Champion: 1946, 1955
 Silver prize winner: 1947, 1948, 1952, 1958
 Bronze prize winner: 1932, 1939, 1943, 1950, 1953, 1954, 1956
Georgian SSR Cup:
 Champion: 1953, 1955
 Finalist: 1944, 1945, 1946, 1951

Football clubs in Georgia (country)
Sport in Kutaisi
1928 establishments in the Transcaucasian Socialist Federative Soviet Republic